SS Lexington may refer to:

 , an American steamship that caught fire and sank in January 1840 with the loss of all but 4 of the 143 on board; wreck reportedly contains gold and silver that went down with the ship
 , an American passenger ship sunk in a collision in 1935

Ship names